Záhradná kaviareň is the fourth studio album by Modus, released on OPUS in 1983.

Track listing

Official releases
 1983: Záhradná kaviareň, LP, MC, OPUS, #9113 1346

Credits and personnel
 Ján Lehotský – lead vocal, chorus, writer, keyboards
 Marika Gombitová – lead vocal, chorus
 Kamil Peteraj – lyrics
 Ján Lauko – producer
 Jozef Hanák – sound director
 Alan Pajer – photography

References

General

Specific

External links 
 

1983 albums
Modus (band) albums